The 2018 Houston Cougars football team represented the University of Houston in the 2018 NCAA Division I FBS football season. The Cougars played their home games at TDECU Stadium in Houston, Texas, and competed in the West Division of the American Athletic Conference. They were led by second-year head coach Major Applewhite. They finished the season 8–5, 5–3 in AAC play to finish in a three-way tie for the West Division championship. After tiebreakers, they did not represent the West Division in the AAC Championship Game. They were invited to the Armed Forces Bowl where they lost to Army by a score of 14–70, in the process tying records for the most points given up (70) and the largest margin-of-loss (56) in NCAA bowl game history.

On December 30, Houston fired Applewhite after 2 seasons.

Previous season
The Cougars finished the 2017 season 7–5, 5–3 in AAC play to finish in second place in the West Division. They were invited to the Hawaii Bowl where they lost to Fresno State.

Preseason

Award watch lists
Listed in the order that they were released

AAC media poll
The AAC media poll was released on July 24, 2018, with the Cougars predicted to finish in second place in the AAC West Division.

Schedule

Schedule Source:

Roster

Game summaries

at Rice

Arizona

at Texas Tech

Texas Southern

Tulsa

at East Carolina

at Navy

South Florida

at SMU

Temple

Tulane

at Memphis

vs. Army (Armed Forces Bowl)

Players drafted into the NFL

Rankings

References

Houston
Houston Cougars football seasons
Houston Cougars football